Round Lake is a training facility for elite Soviet and later Russian gymnasts. It is located outside Moscow.

References

Gymnastics in Russia